Billy Bernard (born 9 April 1991) is a Luxembourger international footballer who plays club football for CS Fola Esch, as a defender.

External links

1991 births
Living people
Luxembourgian footballers
Luxembourg international footballers
CS Fola Esch players
Association football defenders